John Loudon is the name of:
John Loudon (politician) (1866–1955), Dutch foreign minister (1913–1918)
John Claudius Loudon (1783–1843), Scottish botanist
John William Loudon (born 1967), Missouri state senator
John Loudon McAdam (1756–1836), Scottish inventor of the Macadam Road Surface